"Don't Let It Pass You By / Don't Slow Down" is a double A-side single by British group UB40. It was released in 1981 as the first single from the band's second album Present Arms. The single reached No. 16 on the UK Singles Chart in May 1981, staying for nine weeks.

Charts

References

1981 songs
1981 singles
UB40 songs